Monticello High School, now known as Thomas Persons Hall, is a historic high school in Monticello, Georgia. It was added to the National Register of Historic Places on December 14, 1978. The school is located on College Street.

It is a T-shaped three-story building that was completed in 1922.  It was designed by architect Henry Hunter Jordan. It was the first county-wide school in Jasper County.

See also
National Register of Historic Places listings in Jasper County, Georgia
Monticello Crossroads Scenic Byway
Monticello Historic District (Monticello, Georgia)
Jasper County High School (Georgia)

References

High schools in Georgia (U.S. state)
School buildings on the National Register of Historic Places in Georgia (U.S. state)
Buildings and structures in Jasper County, Georgia
National Register of Historic Places in Jasper County, Georgia